The 1963 Major League Baseball All-Star Game was the 34th playing of the midsummer classic between the all-stars of the American League (AL) and National League (NL), the two leagues comprising Major League Baseball. The game was held on July 9, 1963 in Cleveland, Ohio, at Cleveland Municipal Stadium, home of the American League's Cleveland Indians. The game was won by the National League 5–3.

From 1959 to 1962, baseball experimented with a pair of All-Star Games per year. That ended with this 1963 game, which also marked the 30th anniversary of the inaugural All-Star Game played in Chicago in 1933.

Scoring summary
The teams traded runs in the second inning. Willie Mays drew a walk off Ken McBride, stole second and scored on a Dick Groat single. The AL tied the score when Jim O'Toole gave up a Leon Wagner single, hit Zoilo Versalles with a pitch and surrendered an RBI hit to his pitching counterpart, McBride.

In the third, both sides scored twice. Behind 3-1, the AL struck back on a double by Albie Pearson and singles by Frank Malzone and Earl Battey to tie it at 3-all.

The NL scratched out a run off Jim Bunning in the fifth to regain the lead, then made it 5-3 in the eighth when Bill White singled off Dick Radatz, stole second and scored on a Ron Santo single. Don Drysdale closed it out in the eighth and ninth, retiring Bobby Richardson on a game-ending double play.

Rosters
Players in italics have since been inducted into the National Baseball Hall of Fame.

National League

American League

x - injured

y - replacement for injured player

Note:  Bill Mazeroski was selected for the starting lineup, but did not play due to injury.  Julián Javier took his spot in the starting batting order.

Game

Starting lineups

Umpires

Game summary

References

External links
Baseball-Almanac
Baseball-Reference

Major League Baseball All-Star Game
Major League Baseball All-Star Game
Baseball competitions in Cleveland
Major League Baseball All Star Game
July 1963 sports events in the United States
1960s in Cleveland